Kenneth Brooks Standring (born 17 February 1935) is a former English cricketer active from 1954 to 1962 who played for Lancashire. He was born in Clitheroe. He appeared in 13 first-class matches as a lefthanded batsman who bowled right arm fast. He scored 255 runs with a highest score of 41 and held two catches. He took 25 wickets with a best analysis of four for 61.

Notes

1935 births
English cricketers
Lancashire cricketers
Combined Services cricketers
Living people